Readovka is a Russian online news resource, founded in 2011 in Smolensk as a public page on VKontakte. In 2014, its owner created the Readovka website, which at that time specialized in regional news. In 2017, a federal website appeared, covering events in Russia and the world. The Readovka media holding includes the "Ready" communication agency, as well as a group of regional projects united by the "Main in the City" brand.

History 
In 2014, Alexey Kostylev founded the Readovka website in Smolensk, dedicated to events in the region. Prior to that, in 2011, Kostylev created a public page on VKontakte "Important in Smolensk", dedicated to the city. The name "Readovka" comes from the Readovsky Park in Smolensk and from the English word "read". On 9 February 2017, it was registered as an online news resource.

In 2017, the first attempt to relocate the editorial office from Smolensk to Moscow took place, but after they failed, Kostylev decided to separate the editorial offices and founded a separate division in the capital. In November 2020, the holding's head office was moved to Moscow. At the same time, the publication Readovka67 was created, which continues to function today, publishing news about events in Smolensk and the Smolensk Oblast. The media holding also owns the Readovka.by publication about Vitebsk (Belarus), the Ready PR agency and the Readovka.space website.

In 2022, a division was launched to develop a network of local projects united by the Main in the City brand. As of June 2022, own platforms have been launched in more than ten cities, including Sochi, Donetsk and Kherson. Also in March 2022, the Readovka team creates a new Telegram channel “Readovka Explains”, where the publication’s experts briefly answer questions about what is happening now, including in Ukraine and the world in connection with 2022 Russian invasion of Ukraine. The main platform of the Readovka publication is the Telegram channel of the same name, founded in 2018. In April 2022, he crossed the mark of one million subscribers, and, according to the Tgstat service, is one of the five most cited media in the country.

According to the Polish TV channel Belsat TV, in March 2022, part of Yevgeny Prigozhin’s employees became employees of the Readovka.

A number of Russian opposition and some Western publications classify Readovka as a pro-Kremlin resource. However, the owner of the holding himself denies this, stating that Readovka "remains in line with independent journalism"

Litigations and blockings 
In 2020, Shkolnik-UZ LLC filed a lawsuit due to the publication on the Telegram channel of the Readovka publication about the company's possible connection with the poisoning of a student at Moscow School No. 1206.

On 7 July 2021, Readovka temporarily blocked its website by decision of the Vidnovsky City Court of the Moscow Oblast. According to the publication, the reason is the complaint of the deputy of the United Russia party Dmitry Sablin on a series of articles about possible undeclared income and Sablin's participation in the seizure of the "Lenin State Farm" and the Kolkhoz-stud farm named after Maksim Gorky in the Moscow Oblast, posted on the site on 28 January 2020. On 30 August 2021, Roskomnadzor entered a page on the Readovka.ru website into the register of information prohibited in Russia. In the same year, the publication moved to the Readovka.news domain. On 3 September 2021, after deleting seven articles about Sablin, Roskomnadzor unblocked the publication’s website.

On February 26, 2022, Roskomnadzor blocked the Readovka.news website due to an article with the headline “Roskomnadzor decided to block all Telegram in Russia due to Readovka’s post about the lawlessness of migrants in the Kaluga Oblast”.

Criticism 
In 2021, Meduza journalist Ivan Golunov accused Readovka of participating in the closure of the Anti-Corruption Foundation. According to Golunov, Readovka journalists specifically turned to FBK lawyer Lyubov Sobol for help in investigating the case of an outbreak of dysentery in Moscow in 2018. After the publication of the investigation materials on the FBK website, the Moskovsky Shkolnik food plant filed a lawsuit against FBK, which the fund lost, and its accounts, after a series of guilty verdicts and large fines in other cases, were blocked by a court decision, after which the fund announced its closure.Readovka Editor-in-Chief Aleksey Kostylev denied the accusations, saying that before turning to Sobol for help, Readovka had approached other media outlets, including Meduza, and was refused.

On 8 April 2022, Readovka announced a boycott of Dmitry Peskov, press secretary of the President of Russia, due to his positive remarks about TV presenter Ivan Urgant who left Russia after the Russian invasion of Ukraine.

On 11 April 2022, the "We Can Explain" Telegram channel published an article about changes in the editorial office of Readovka since the outbreak of hostilities in Ukraine. According to the dismissed employees, the publication previously featured a nationalist bias and covered the actions of political activists, but after February 24, it changed its composition and switched to military propaganda.

In April 2022, material was published that at a closed briefing by the Russian Ministry of Defense, 13,414 dead Russian soldiers were reported during the Russian invasion of Ukraine. The publication later removed the material; On April 22, 2022, the editors of Readovka published an official announcement that the community on VKontakte had been hacked and that the source of the hack had been identified, as well as that the post was promptly replicated by the Ukrainian media and Telegram channels. As the editors stated, the hacking was carried out by a former employee of the publication Vasily Krestyaninov, and such a briefing was never held:

References 

Russian news websites
Russian nationalism